"Beat Box" is a song by English avant-garde synth-pop group Art of Noise. Originally appearing as the second track on the 12" EP Into Battle with the Art of Noise (1983), it was released as the group's first single in December 1983.

"Beat Box" is an instrumental, experimental piece that implements sounds and noises (such as car key ignitions, falling drain water, and calliope music—most notably on the chorus) to ride the rhythm of the beat (a sample of drums played by Alan White of the progressive rock band Yes).

As a single, the song reached the lower regions of the UK Singles Chart, where it peaked at no. 92. It was more popular with dance music and (particularly) hip hop audiences, and in February 1984 the song reached no. 1 on the American dance chart, where it remained for two weeks. "Beat Box" was a hit on the Black Singles chart, where it reached no. 10. The US 7" single spent 5 weeks on the Billboard Bubbling Under chart, starting 7 April 1984 and spending two weeks at no. 101, the chart's top position.

After the original "Beat Box" grew popular, Art of Noise decided to expand on the tune by adding on more instruments and sounds, giving the song a completely different outlook and practically drowning out the hip hop element that now only remained in the drum beat itself. Two remix cuts resulted from this session and were initially released on 12" single in 1984 and referred to as "Diversion One" and "Diversion Two", along with the song "Moments in Love". The original unremixed version has retroactively been dubbed "Diversion Zero" by fans, though it was never officially released under this title. Other remixes were issued, and are officially subtitled variously as Diversions Three, Four, Six, Seven and Ten.

The song as well as another Art of Noise song, "Moments in Love", can be heard in the video game Grand Theft Auto: Vice City Stories (2006) and Grand Theft Auto V (2013). It also formed the basis for the theme for the British game show, The Krypton Factor. A sample can be found in the song "Love Is Everywhere" by WestBam (a popular German DJ) & the Love Committee, which was an anthem for the Berlin Love Parade in 2007. Rapper Tech N9ne also samples the song for the single, "Bout Ta' Bubble" from his 2006 album, Everready (The Religion).

The artwork of some editions has "Beat Box" as one word, "Beatbox".

The LP version of the group's second hit, "Close (to the Edit)" is nearly the same as "Beat Box (Diversion Two)". The former has 20 seconds cut from the middle, and reverb changes made at certain points in the mix, but is otherwise the same song.

Formats and track listing

7": ZTT. / ZTIS 103 United Kingdom
"Beat Box" (Original 7" Edit) – 2:55
"Moments in Love" – 4:02
Originally released in 1983.
The 2:55 version is actually an edit of the first version of "Beat Box" (as appeared on Into Battle)

7": ZTT. / ZTIS 108 United Kingdom
"Beat Box" (Diversion Six) – 3:57
"Beat Box" (Diversion Seven) – 4:09
Released in 1984.
"Beat Box" (Diversion Six) is also known as Beat Box (Diversion Ten) & The Ambassadors Reel (Beat Box)
"Beat Box" (Diversion Six), "Beat Box" (Diversion Ten) & The Ambassadors Reel (Beat Box) are 7" Edits of Diversion One.

12": ZTT. / ZTIS 108 United Kingdom
"Beat Box" (Diversion One) – 8:33
"Beat Box" (Diversion Two) – 6:04
Released in 1984

7": ISL. / Island Records 7-99782 United States
"Beat Box" (Original 7" Edit) – 2:55
"Moments in Love" – 1:22
Released in 1984.
The 2:55 version is actually an edit of the first version of "Beat Box" (as appeared on Into Battle)

7": ISL. / Island Records PR 595 United States
"Beat Box" (Special Radio Re-Edit) – 2:54
"Beat Box" (Special Radio Re-Edit) – 2:54
Released in 1984.
Also called the "Shep Pettibone Radio Edit" and differs from the 2.55 Original 7" Edit.

12": ISL. / Island Records 0-96859 United States
"Beat Box" (Diversion One) – 8:33
"Close (To the Edit)" – 5:37
Released in 1985.

7": ISL. / Island Records 106.371 The Netherlands
"Beat Box" (Edit by Trevor Horn) – 4:17
"Beat Box" – 4:26
Released in 1984.
Unique edit of "Beat Box" (Diversion One) cut in two parts.

Versions
Original version (4:48) appears on Into Battle with the Art of Noise (1983).
Original 7" edit (2:55) and U.S. Special 7" Re-Edit (2:52), derived from the original version.
"Diversion One" (8:30) is a 12" remix. appears on Who's Afraid of the Art of Noise? (1984) and many compilations.
"Diversion Six" also known as "Diversion Ten" and also known "Ambassador's Reel: Beat Box" (3:54) is a 7" edit of "Diversion One".
"Diversion Two" (6:02), often said to be a longer version of "Close (to the Edit)".
"Diversion Seven" (4:10), is an edit of "Diversion Two", originally released on the 1984 UK "Beat Box" 7" (ZTIS 108) and the compilation album Influence: Hits, Singles, Moments, Treasures....
"Diversion Three" and "Diversion Four" (6:49), remixes appearing on an NME cassette "Department of Enjoyment" (1984).
"Diversion Five" (3:43) appearing on the Deluxe 4-CD Set And What Have You Done with My Body, God?.
"Diversion Eight" (2:05) is the intro to the "That Was Close" cassette single.
"Diverted", appearing on a 1999 release featuring never-heard before Art of Noise sessions in their studio.

Further tracks more closely related to "Diversion Two", see main article: "Close (to the Edit)".
"Ambassador's Reel: Beat Box" can be found on the 4-CD set And What Have You Done with My Body, God?.
The whole "That Was Close" cassette (CTIS 106) was later released on the 4-CD set And What Have You Done with My Body, God?.

Charts

See also
List of number-one dance singles of 1984 (U.S.)

References

External links

1983 songs
1983 debut singles
Art of Noise songs
Island Records singles
Song recordings produced by Trevor Horn
Songs written by Trevor Horn
Songs written by Anne Dudley
ZTT Records singles